John Edgar Bailey (1897 – 14 November 1958) was a Unionist politician in Northern Ireland.

A farmer by profession, he was educated at private school and was a member of Down County Council. He was elected to the House of Commons of Northern Ireland from the West Down seat in 1938, and represented the constituency until his death in 1958. He served as Assistant Parliamentary Secretary to the Ministry of Finance and Assistant Whip from 1945 to 1958.

References

|-

|-

1897 births
1958 deaths
Members of the House of Commons of Northern Ireland 1938–1945
Members of the House of Commons of Northern Ireland 1945–1949
Members of the House of Commons of Northern Ireland 1949–1953
Members of the House of Commons of Northern Ireland 1953–1958
Members of the House of Commons of Northern Ireland 1958–1962
Northern Ireland junior government ministers (Parliament of Northern Ireland)
Ulster Unionist Party members of the House of Commons of Northern Ireland
Farmers from Northern Ireland
Members of Down County Council
Members of the House of Commons of Northern Ireland for County Down constituencies